The Ocean was a monthly pulp magazine which was started by Frank Munsey in March 1907.  It published fact and fiction about sea-faring for eleven issues before being retitled The Live Wire so that it could cover a wider range of topics.  The new title lasted for another eight issues before being folded in September 1908.

References

Magazines established in 1907
Magazines disestablished in 1908
Pulp magazines
Defunct magazines published in the United States
Monthly magazines published in the United States